Stadionul Orășenesc can refer to:

Stadiums in Romania:
Stadionul Orășenesc (Buftea)
Stadionul Orășenesc (Mioveni)
Stadionul Orășenesc (Ovidiu)

Stadiums in Moldova:
Stadionul Orășenesc (Bălți)
Stadionul Orășenesc (Hîncești)
Stadionul Orășenesc (Rîbnița)
Stadionul Orășenesc (Tiraspol)

See also 
Stadionul Municipal (disambiguation)